Shomyrtly (Şomortlo) is a rural locality (a village) in Sukhorechensky Selsoviet, Bizhbulyaksky District, Bashkortostan, Russia. The population was 3 as of 2010. There is 1 street.

Geography 
Shomyrtly is located 43 km west of Bizhbulyak (the district's administrative centre) by road. Isyakayevo is the nearest rural locality.

References 

Rural localities in Bizhbulyaksky District